Aleksandar Stoyanov Kostadinov (born July 28, 1988) is an amateur Bulgarian Greco-Roman wrestler, who competes in the men's featherweight category. He won a bronze medal for his division at the 2012 European Wrestling Championships in Belgrade, Serbia. He is also a member of Slavia Litex Wrestling Club in Sofia, and is coached and trained by Bratan Tzenov.

Kostadinov represented Bulgaria at the 2012 Summer Olympics in London, where he competed in the men's 55 kg class. He received a bye for the preliminary round of sixteen, before losing out to China's Li Shujin, with a three-set technical score (2–0, 0–2, 0–2), and a classification point score of 1–3.

References

External links
 
 NBC Olympics Profile
 

1988 births
Living people
Olympic wrestlers of Bulgaria
Wrestlers at the 2012 Summer Olympics
People from Kyustendil
European Games competitors for Bulgaria
Wrestlers at the 2015 European Games
Bulgarian male sport wrestlers
Sportspeople from Kyustendil Province
20th-century Bulgarian people
21st-century Bulgarian people